Darko Lovrić (born 24 November 1980) is a Serbian football manager and former player.

Playing career
Lovrić started out at his hometown club Radnički Šid at the age of 7. He later joined Vojvodina, but quickly moved to Zvezdara, helping them win promotion to the 2001–02 First League of FR Yugoslavia. Later on, Lovrić played for Radnički Beograd in the 2004–05 First League of Serbia and Montenegro.

In the summer of 2008, Lovrić moved from Bežanija to Vojvodina. He was loaned to Armenian club Banants in early 2010. Between 2010 and 2012, Lovrić spent two seasons with Hapoel Ashkelon in Israel. He subsequently returned to Serbia and played two seasons with Sloboda Užice until 2014.

Managerial career
In April 2022, Lovrić replaced Darko Baljak as manager of Sloga Erdevik.

References

External links
 
 

1980 births
Living people
People from Šid
Serbia and Montenegro footballers
Serbian footballers
Association football defenders
FK Radnički Šid players
FK Vojvodina players
FK Zvezdara players
FK Srem players
FK Železnik players
FK Radnički Beograd players
FK Voždovac players
FK Bežanija players
FC Urartu players
Hapoel Ashkelon F.C. players
FK Sloboda Užice players
FK Radnički Sremska Mitrovica players
Second League of Serbia and Montenegro players
First League of Serbia and Montenegro players
Serbian SuperLiga players
Armenian Premier League players
Israeli Premier League players
Liga Leumit players
Serbian expatriate footballers
Expatriate footballers in Armenia
Expatriate footballers in Israel
Serbian expatriate sportspeople in Armenia
Serbian expatriate sportspeople in Israel
Serbian football managers